The Odesa Museum of Regional History is a historical museum in Odesa, Ukraine. It is dedicated to the regional history of Odesa.

The museum building 

The museum is located in the centre of the city, in the palatial mansion at 4 Gavannaya Street. The mansion was built in 1876 by Odesa architect, Felix Gonsiorovskiy,  for one of the major representatives of the industrial and commercial elite, Alexander Yakovlevich Novikov. Novikov was the grandson of Odesa merchant, Ilya Novikov, owner of a cable factory that was founded in 1806. The architecture of the two-storey mansion, as in previous works of Felix Gonsiorovskiy, is based on the style of the late Renaissance, with a variation of patterns and motifs drawn from the architectural heritage of Italy.

Until 1899, the mansion was known in Odesa as the "House of Novikov," and in the early 20th century it was acquired by the city. In 1907, the house was leased to Odesa Assembly, a commercial operation. After October 1917, the house often changed owners; it was used as a club, a library, and a classroom. The basement and part of the ground floor rooms were used as housing.

History 
The museum's collection includes about 120,000 exhibits and is considered one of the best in Ukraine. It includes: documents signed by Catherine II, Grigory Potemkin, Alexander Suvorov, Platon Zubov, Mikhail Kutuzov, José de Ribas, Louis Alexandre Andrault de Langeron; architectural and engineering designs of buildings which are representative of Odesa; graphic and pictorial works of artists in Odesa; portraiture from 18th–early 20th centuries painted by A. Moklakovski, E. Bukovetsky, H. Kuznetsov, G. Chestahovski, D. Krainev; collection of icons, weapons and household items, numismatic and cartographic material.

Exposure 

Currently, the museum houses a number of permanent exhibits: "Old Odessa", "Odesa and the end of World War II, 1941–1945", "Weapons of the museum's collection", "The Ukrainian Steppe" (located at ul. Lanzheronovskaya, 24a).

Gallery

References 

 Одеський історико-краєзнавчий музей
 The Odesa Regional History Museum

Museums in Odesa
Ukrainian studies
History of Odesa
History museums in Ukraine